Knowledge Power is a Philippine educational show aired on ABS-CBN, It aired from July 5, 1998, to February 28, 2004, and was replaced by Nginiiig. A spin-off of host Ernie Baron's Hoy Gising! segment and TV Patrol segment Itanong Kay Ka Ernie. It aired every Sunday from 5:30 p.m. to 6:00 p.m, the show is educational and informative even as it also entertains. The topics are highly informative, engaging and mostly out-of-the-ordinary. The program is a cross between Ripley's Believe It or Not! and Discovery Channel. It does not only explore into the bizarre and the extraordinary, but pursues light yet thought-provoking, significant and highly-instructive items. Features sometimes serve as survival tips for viewers. Through extensive research and creative production, the show delves on the sciences, health, history, paranormal, cultures, civilizations, people, among others.

The show aims to educate and entertain. The educational bent of the show is primarily geared towards enhancing children’s outlooks and potentials.

The show's title alludes to the widely quoted statement by Sir Francis Bacon, "Knowledge is power" (from Religious Meditations, Of Heresies 1597).

Host
Ernie Baron

Format
The program is divided into four gaps—two main stories and two regular segments—which include "For Your Information" and "Health Tips ni Ka Ernie." Some new segments are "See Them Here First," "The First Knowledge," "Gallery," "Bakit Nga Ba?" "Question and Answer," "Scrabble, Scramble" and "What If."

Accolades
The show won as Best Educational Program & Host in the 2004 & 2005  PMPC Star Awards for Television.

See also
 Matanglawin

References

Philippine television shows
ABS-CBN original programming
1998 Philippine television series debuts
2004 Philippine television series endings
1990s Philippine television series
Philippine educational television series
Filipino-language television shows